The Camping World 225 was a NASCAR Gander RV & Outdoors Truck Series race that took place at Chicagoland Speedway in Joliet, Illinois.

History
The race debuted in 2009 and marked the first time that the Camping World Truck Series raced at Chicagoland, although the Truck Series had previously raced at Chicago Motor Speedway in 2000 and 2001. The race was run on Friday night under the lights. It was paired with an ARCA RE/MAX Series race that was run earlier the same day, and an IndyCar Series race run the following day.

From 2016 to 2017, it served as the final race of NASCAR's "regular season" for the Truck Series; following the race, the top eight drivers in points standings advance to the seven-race NASCAR Camping World Truck Series playoffs. It moved to a midseason date in 2018.

The 2020 race was canceled due to the COVID-19 pandemic. It was dropped entirely from the NASCAR schedule in 2021.

Past winners

2010 and 2016: This race was extended due to a NASCAR Overtime finish.
2014 and 2015: Race moved from Friday to Saturday due to rain.
2020: Race canceled and moved to Kansas due to the COVID-19 pandemic.

Multiple winners (drivers)

Multiple winners (teams)

Manufacturer wins

References

External links
 

NASCAR Truck Series races
Former NASCAR races
 
Annual sporting events in the United States
Recurring sporting events established in 2009
2009 establishments in Illinois
Recurring sporting events disestablished in 2020